Football is by far the most popular sport in Paraguay. Paraguay's national team has played at eight FIFA World Cup competitions and has won two Copa América tournaments. Olimpia Asunción is the country's most successful club in domestic and international competitions. Paraguay's football leagues are divided into four divisions. In 2020, Paraguay's top-tier was ranked 8th in the world by the IFFHS.

History

Football arrived to Paraguay in the late 1800s. There are differing versions as to how this happened. The most commonly held account is that of William Paats. This account has much primary source documentation (newspaper articles) As this version goes, football was first introduced in Paraguay by Dutchman William Paats, who moved from the Netherlands to Asunción (the capital of Paraguay) in 1888. During a trip to Buenos Aires Paats bought a football and brought it back to Asunción in order to teach the sport, which was unknown among Paraguayans. At first, football was only practiced by the "elite" (upper class) but it soon became very popular and spread quickly throughout the whole country to people of all social classes.

Another version brings the genesis of football in Paraguay a bit further back, to 1886 and in the area around Borja. Miguel Angel Bestard, in his authoritative volume "Paraguay: One Century of Football" recounts a story about how English railroad workers organized games against the local Paraguayans. The English team was named "Everton", as a clear homage to the club from Liverpool, England, in the United Kingdom.

In 1900, small tournaments were held at the Plaza de Armas, a plaza located in downtown Asunción. Because of the huge success of the tournaments and the large attendances for the games, Paats decided to found the first Paraguayan football club, which he named Olimpia Football Club (later renamed Club Olimpia) in 1902. By 1906 the number of football clubs in Paraguay had increased and the Paraguayan Football Association (governing body of football in Paraguay) was founded. In 1910, Paraguay formed its first national squad to play against the squad from Corrientes, Argentina, but it would have to wait till 1919 for the Argentine national team to take a boat upriver on the Parana River and visit Asuncion for the first official international games Paraguay would ever play.

The Paraguayan Football Association joined CONMEBOL in 1921, and FIFA in 1925.

Football has grown enormously since then, and there are over 1600 teams spread throughout Paraguay participating in bla leagues. Each of those teams try to make their way to the first division by clearing the different levels of lower divisions. The growth and evolution of Paraguayan football can be seen in the achievements made in the club level and by the Paraguay national football team. The national team has participated in eight FIFA World Cups, won two Copa América tournaments, and earned a silver medal at the Olympic Games in 2004. All these accomplishments established Paraguay as the fourth most successful football nation in South America behind Argentina, Brazil and Uruguay. At the club level, Olimpia Asunción has won a total of eight international tournaments, including three Copa Libertadores and one Intercontinental Cup.

Among the most important and successful football players in Paraguayan history are Arsenio Erico, Aurelio González, Romerito and José Luis Chilavert.

In 2016, Roque Santa Cruz was regarded as one of the best players in the nation's history.

National team

Paraguay's men's national team, nicknamed the Albirroja, is controlled by the Paraguayan Football Association (Asociación Paraguaya de Fútbol). The team has qualified for eight FIFA World Cup competitions, with their best performance coming in 2010 when they reached the quarter-finals. Paraguay has been crowned champions of the Copa América on two occasions (in 1953 and 1979). Their highest FIFA World Rankings was 8th (March 2001) and their lowest was 103 (May 1995). Paraguay was awarded second place with Best Move of the Year in 1996 for their rise in the FIFA Rankings. The team's most successful period was under the coaching of Argentine Gerardo Martino, who was awarded with the South American Coach of the Year in 2007 and took Paraguay to the quarter-finals stage of the FIFA World Cup competition for the first time in history (in 2010) and also to the final of the 2011 Copa América, where Paraguay finished as runners-up. In Paraguay's entire history at the FIFA World Cup, only Carlos Gamarra and José Luis Chilavert have both been selected as part of the All-Star Team, being for the 1998 edition. Paulo da Silva holds the most appearances for the team with 148 matches and Roque Santa Cruz is the all-time leading goal scorer with 32 goals.

The women's team of Paraguay, also known as Albirroja, has lesser success, having never qualified for a single FIFA Women's World Cup, but has seen its recent rise in fortune. In the 2022 Copa América Femenina, Paraguay reached the semi-finals for only the second time after 2006, though this means Paraguay is now certain to have a potential spot for the upcoming 2023 FIFA Women's World Cup or at least going to the playoff stage.

Television and Media
Television coverage of Paraguay's top-tier league, the Copa Paraguay and most of the second-tier, third-tier and fourth-tier leagues are televisionally transmitted by:

 Multideporte
 Unicanal
 Tigo Sports
 Tigo Max
 Telefuturo
 Paravisión
 TVC Sports 2
 GolTV
 TVC Sports

Internet coverage of Paraguayan football was accessible online until 2015 by football writer and Guinness World Records Latin American representative Ralph Hannah.

League system

Paraguay's Football League System is divided into four divisions:

 Primera División Paraguaya
 División Intermedia
 Tercera Division
 Cuarta Division

Promotion to the top-tier, second-tier and third-tier leagues begins from the country's fourth-tier leagues, regional and metroplitana. A club is disaffiliated from the fourth division if it finishes the season in the last position of the table.

Past Paraguay national team players, including Enrique Vera, Oscar Cardozo, Nelson Haedo Valdez, Antolín Alcaraz, Elvis Marecos, Pablo Zeballos, Paulo da Silva, Cristian Riveros and Victor Caceres all began their careers in Paraguay's lower leagues.

As of the 2021 season, the winner of the División Intermedia would qualify directly for the Copa Sudamericana competition of the following season.

Seasons

Current season: 2021 in Paraguayan football

Women's football

The Paraguayan women's football championship is the top level league competition for women's football in Paraguay. The winner qualifies for the Copa Libertadores de Fútbol Femenino, the South American Champions League. The competition is organised by the Paraguayan Football Association.

Superclásico

The Paraguayan derby or superclásico is between Club Olimpia Asunción and Club Cerro Porteño.

Players and records

Paraguayan Footballer of the Year

The Paraguayan Footballer of the Year is an award given to the best Paraguayan professional football player every year. The award began officially in 1997 and it is presented by Paraguayan newspaper ABC Color.

Primera División Paraguaya Topscorers

The following list only comprises the professional era and is missing data from 1906 to 1934 (amateur era). A Top 10 table follows.

Players who have played for both clubs in the Superclásico

Players who have played for Cerro Porteño and Olimpia Asunción. An Incomplete List follows.

  Carlos Bonet
  Carlos Gamarra
  Casiano Delvalle
  Diego Barreto
  Fabian Caballero
  Fredy Bareiro
  Gabriel Gonzalez
  Ivan Torres
  Nelson Cuevas
  Pablo Zeballos
  Rodrigo Rojas
  Sergio Aquino
  Sergio Goycochea
  Willian Candia

Foreigner football players

CONMEBOL foreign football players
For CONMEBOL or South American foreign football players in Paraguay, Argentina, Brazil and Uruguay are the countries that have contributed most players to Paraguayan football. Argentine football players, such as Roberto Acuña and Ricardo Ismael Rojas, played in for several years in Paraguay's leagues and even naturalized themselves to play for the national team. Argentine Héctor Núñez, Uruguayan Hernan Rodrigo Lopez and Brazilian Gauchinho are the only non-Paraguayan football players to be leading goalscorers of the Primera División Paraguaya in a single season, including the Apertura and Clausura. Héctor Núñez is the only foreign player to win the goalscoring title back-to-back (1994–1995), playing for Cerro Porteño. A Top 10 table follows.

Non-CONMEBOL foreign football players
Most non-CONMEBOL or non-South American foreign football players in Paraguay's football leagues have come from African (CAF) countries, especially Cameroon, and from Asian (AFC) countries, especially Japan. Amongst the non-CONMEBOL foreign football players in Paraguay, the most iconic signing in Paraguayan football and the highest paid player in the country's history was the Togolese Emmanuel Adebayor, when he joined Olimpia Asunción in 2020. Between 2008 and 2011, 30 under-15 footballers from Indonesia, including Zikri Akbar and Rahmanuddin played at diverse clubs in Paraguay's Football League. In 2016, Trinidad and Tobago women's national team players Kennya Cordner and Kimika Forbes became the first CONCACAF players in to win a trophy in the CONMEBOL, being crowned champions of the Copa Libertadores Femenina with Paraguayan club Sportivo Limpeño. A Top 10 table follows.

Youngest debutants
An Top 5 list follows of the youngest players to debut in Paraguayan football.

Youngest goal scorers
An incomplete list follows of the youngest goal scoring players in Paraguayan football.

Highest goal scorers
An incomplete list follows of the highest goal scoring players in Paraguayan football.

Highest paid players
An incomplete list follows of the highest paid players in Paraguayan football. Togolese Emmanuel Adebayor became the highest paid player in the history of Paraguayan football when he joined Olimpia Asunción in 2020.

Highest transfer
Since 1999, Roque Santa Cruz held the highest transfer fee from Olimpia Asunción to Bayern Munich for USD$6, 900, 000.00 before Juan Escobar was sold from Cerro Porteño to Mexican team Cruz Azul for USD$7, 000, 000.00 in 2019. In January 2022, Julio Enciso was sold to FA Premier League team Brighton & Hove Albion from Libertad for USD$9, 500, 000.00, a new record of highest transfer in Paraguayan football.

Clubs

Mostly, football clubs in Paraguay count with the structure of several categories for all ages.

Categories for over-age players follow:

 First teams
 Substitutes
 Reserve teams

Categories for under-age players follow:

 Under-20 teams
 Under-19 teams
 Under-18 teams
 Under-17 teams
 Under-16 teams
 Under-15 teams
 Formation Football Schools

Stadiums

The country's most important stadiums are:

 Estadio Defensores del Chaco
 Estadio General Pablo Rojas
 Estadio Feliciano Caceres
 Estadio Río Parapití
 Estadio Antonio Aranda

The mentioned were venues for the 1999 Copa América. The Estadio Defensores del Chaco has more than 100 years as a stadium, and it is one of the places with most history in Paraguayan football. In 2015, the Estadio General Pablo Rojas which belongs to Club Cerro Porteño, began undergoing expansion and remodeling to become the most increased stadium in the country with a 51, 237 capacity.

Other stadiums include:

 Estadio Manuel Ferreira
 Estadio Dr. Nicolás Leoz

The mentioned stadiums are venues of the Primera Division Paraguaya and have seating.

See also
 Paraguayan football league system
 Primera División Paraguaya
 División Intermedia
 Paraguayan Tercera División
 Paraguayan Primera División B
 Primera División B Nacional
 Paraguayan Cuarta División
 Campeonato Nacional de Interligas
 Unión del Fútbol del Interior
 Paraguayan women's football championship
 Football Federation of the 1st Department Concepción
 Football Federation of the 2nd Department San Pedro
 Football Federation of the 3rd Department Cordillera
 Football Federation of the 4th Department Guairá
 Football Federation of the 5th Department Caaguazú
 Football Federation of the 6th Department Caazapá

Notes

References

External links 
 Paraguayan football association website
 Paraguayan football history (in Spanish)